This is a list of endangered languages with mobile apps available for use in language revitalization.

Endangered Australian languages with mobile apps

The Living Archive of Aboriginal Languages (LAAL) is a digital archive of literature in endangered languages of Australia, containing works in over forty Australian Aboriginal languages from the Northern Territory, Australia. The LAAL Reader app is available on Apple App Store and Google Play.

Individual languages
 Anindilyakwa language (Northern Territory) The NT Languages Anindilyakwa app provides flash cards in English and Anindilyakwa, and provides audio samples of both. Some words also include hand movements in small video clips. Available in Apple and Android
 Barngarla language (South Australia) – A mobile app featuring a dictionary of over 3000 Barngarla words.
 Erub Mer (Torres Strait Island language, Queensland)
 Iwaidja language (Northern Territory) – The Ma! Iwadja app is being used to teach the language.
 Miriwoong language (Western Australia) – a mobile app dictionary of 1400 words and phrases
 Wiradjuri language (New South Wales) – a mobile app available for iOS, Android and a web based version.
 Yawuru language (Western Australia)

Endangered Asian languages with mobile apps
 Kristang (Malacca Creole Portuguese) The Kriseh Kristang ('Grow, Kristang') Memrise course was released in July 2016.

Endangered Oceanian languages with mobile apps 

 Hawaiian language – In 2018, Duolingo added a Hawaiian language course

Endangered Native American languages with mobile apps

 Arikara language
 Blackfoot language - The Siksika Nation has created an app for IOS devices that can be downloaded here.
 Caddo language
 Cherokee language
 Chickasaw language
 Comox language — A Sliammon iPhone app was released in March 2012. An online dictionary, phrasebook, and language learning portal is available at FirstVoices.
 Cree language app - produced by the Maskwacis Cree of Samsun Cree Nation
 Dakota language
 Haida language — A Skidegate Haida language app is available for iPhone, based on a "bilingual dictionary and phrase collection  words and phrases archived at the online Aboriginal language database FirstVoices.com."
 Halkomelem language — A Halkomelem iPhone app was released in 2011.
 Inuvialuk language
 Konkow language
 Kutenai language — A Kutenai language app, Ktunaxa is available at the FirstVoices website.
 Lakota language
 Lillooet language
 Luiseño language
Mandan language
Navajo language
 Nisga’a language
 Nuu-chah-nulth language
 Nheengatu
 Ojibwe language
 Saanich dialect
 Seneca language — As of January 2013, a Seneca language app was under development.
 Stoney Nakoda language - this app was produced by the Stoney Nakoda Nation.
 Tanacross language
 Tlingit language
 Tłı̨chǫ language
 Upper Kuskokwim language
 Winnebago language

Endangered European languages with mobile apps 
 Cornish
 Low German — PlattinO App to learn the east frisisan variety. ALWiNE released by the University of Greifswald for the Mecklenburgish-West Pomeranian variety.
 Manx Gaelic
 Söl'ring dialect — Mobile friendly web app at friisk.org was released in 2018 for translations, conjugations, and pronunciations.

References

External links
 FirstVoices.com
 A review of indigenous language learning apps

Language revival
Endangered languages
Lists of endangered languages
Indigenous languages of the Americas
Endangered languages